Idlib Municipal Stadium is an all-seater football stadium in Idlib, Syria. It is currently used by Omayya Idlib. The stadium has a capacity of 7,500 spectators.

In 2010, the stadium was entirely renovated and turned into all-seater.

See also
List of football stadiums in Syria

References

Football venues in Syria
Idlib
Sports venues completed in 1985
1985 establishments in Syria